Busanjin Station is a railroad stations in Busan, South Korea.

 Busanjin Station (Korail)
 Busanjin Station (Busan Metro)